Conveyor is an American art rock band from Brooklyn, New York.  The band consists of T.J. Masters (vocals, guitar), Alan Busch (vocals, guitar), Evan Garfield (backing vocals, drums), and Michael Pedron (backing vocals, bass).

They have released two full-length albums as well as a number of self-released singles and EPs.

History
The band was formed in early 2011 when its members, who met as musicians in Gainesville, Florida, moved to Brooklyn, New York.  They began self-releasing records and performing around New York City in the spring of 2011. Conveyor released their eponymous debut full-length record on Paper Garden Records in 2012.

Conveyor's musical style has been compared to that of Talking Heads and Dirty Projectors, with "a quasi-African lilt that happens to be bent by... odd meters."

The band has recorded live sessions for Grooveshark, Daytrotter and the Bonnaroo Music Festival.  It has also been featured on numerous press outlets, including The New York Times, NPR, Filter, The Deli Magazine, and MTV Hive.

Personnel
T.J. Masters – vocals, guitar
Alan Busch – vocals, guitar
Evan Garfield – vocals, drums
Michael Pedron – vocals, bass

Discography

Albums
Conveyor 2012 (Paper Garden Records)
Prime 2014 (Live score for THX1138 performed at Nitehawk Cinema in Brooklyn)
Ready Not Ready 2016 (Gold Robot Records)

EPs
Sun Ray 2011 (self-released, limited to 500 copies on orange vinyl) 
Three Carols 2011 (self-released, limited to 25 copies on purple cassette tape)
Ani Mag 2014 (Gold Robot Records)

Singles
 "This Building Is for Everyone" 2011 (self-released) 
 "Mukraker" 7", 2012 (self-released, limited to 500 copies on clear vinyl) 
 "Mane" 7", 2012 (Gold Robot Records, limited to 500 copies on white vinyl)
 "Mammal Food / Pushups" 7", 2013 (Gold Robot Records, limited to 250 copies on gold vinyl)

See also

 List of alternative rock artists
 List of bands formed in New York
 List of experimental musicians
 List of indie rock musicians

References

External links
 , the band's official website

2011 establishments in New York City
American experimental musical groups
American art rock groups
Indie rock musical groups from New York (state)
Musical groups established in 2011
Musical groups from Brooklyn
Progressive rock musical groups from New York (state)
Psychedelic rock music groups from New York (state)